The Dogo Argentino (plural Dogos Argentinos) is an Argentine breed of large dog of mastiff type. It was bred in the early twentieth century in Córdoba in central Argentina, primarily for dog-fighting, but also for hunting large game such as peccaries,pumas and wild boar. The foundation stock included a fighting dog of bulldog type, a Bull Terrier and a Mastín del Pirineo.

History 

In the 1920s Antonio Nores Martinez, a young student of Córdoba in central Argentina, set out to create a new breed of fighting dog. He wanted it to have the fighting qualities of the Old Cordoba Fighting Dog, but with greater size and strength. He started with a Bull Terrier bitch with considerable fighting ability, which he bred to a spotted fighting dog of bulldog type. He selected and inter-bred their offspring, selecting for white coat colour and rejecting any animal that was retrognathous (undershot). In the eighth generation he introduced a Mastín del Pirineo bitch; by the twelfth generation his dogs were breeding true. They became well known for their success in the ring. Nores Martinez later introduced crosses with a variety of other dogs including the Irish Wolfhound.

In 1947 he presented his breed to the Club de Cazadores ('hunter's club') of Buenos Aires; in 1948 a breed standard was published in the magazine Diana.

The Dogo was definitively accepted by the Fédération Cynologique Internationale in 1973.

Characteristics 

The length of the body is slightly greater than the height at the withers, up to a maximum of one tenth more.

The coat is short and always white. A single black or dark-coloured spot on the head is tolerated as long as it is no larger than one tenth of the size of the head.

The muzzle is of about the same length as the skull.

Temperament

Dogos Argentinos are big-game hunters and are also trained for search and rescue, police assistance, service dogs, guide for the blind, competitive obedience, Schutzhund, and military work.

The Dogo Argentino is a hunter of great courage and endurance, and will work individually or in packs. It has also successfully been used in police protection work. An unsteady temperament is a serious fault. {UKC Breed Standard} The Dogo Argentino has a life expectancy of 10 to 12 years.

Health

As in the Dalmatian, white Boxer, and white Bull Terrier, the Dogo Argentino may experience pigment-related deafness. There is possibility of an approximate 10% deafness rate overall with some dogs afflicted uniaurally (one deaf ear) and some binaurally (deaf in both ears). Studies have shown that the incidence of deafness is drastically reduced when the only breeding stock used is that with bilaterally normal hearing.

Hunting and legality
While the Dogo Argentino was bred primarily from the extinct Cordoba fighting dog, it was bred to be a cooperative hunter, i.e. to accompany other catch dogs and bay dogs on the hunt without fighting with the other dogs.

The Dogo Argentino is banned or has ownership restrictions in certain countries, including 
the Cayman Islands,
Denmark,
Norway,
Fiji,
Iceland, 
Australia,
New Zealand, 
Singapore, Hong Kong and Turkey.
In the United Kingdom, under the Dangerous Dogs Act 1991, it is illegal to own a Dogo Argentino without lawful authority.

References 

Catch dogs
Dog breeds originating in Argentina
FCI breeds
Hunting dogs